Yardley Court is a private day preparatory school for boys in Tonbridge, Kent, England, founded in 1898 by Mr and Mrs Auldwinckle Bickmore. It now forms part of Somerhill, a public school in the British sense of the term.

There are currently around 250 boys in the school, aged between 7 and 13. The school occupies a site of 152 acres just outside Tonbridge, and is self-contained on listed park land. Since its foundation the school has been located on two sites, including the current site. Originally the school was situated in Yardley Park Road, close to Tonbridge School. For the academic year 2018/19, Yardley charges £5,155 per term.

The Headmaster since 2017 is Duncan Sinclair, previously Headmaster of Taunton Preparatory School and Deputy Headmaster at St Michael's Prep School, Otford.

History
Founded in 1898, Yardley Court was in its early years run by members of the Bickmore family, initially by A.L.Bickmore and later by his sons Maurice Bickmore (MHB) and Eric Bickmore (AFB). Eric Bickmore played cricket for Oxford University (1920–21) and for Kent County Cricket Club (1919–29). Its original location was situated in Yardley Park Road, close to Tonbridge School.

In 1973 when Eric Bickmore retired, his sons John Bickmore and Michael Bickmore ran the school as joint headmasters. They were known as “Dr John” and “Mr Michael”. Dr John’s wife, Mary Blaikie, was school matron and known as “Mrs John”.

In 1982 Dr John died. And in 1983, the first non-Bickmore, John Barber was appointed joint headmaster alongside Mr Michael. Mr Barber had been a senior teacher for some years prior. Mr Michael retired in 1990 and Mr Barber resigned suddenly in 1992. Mr Barber was replaced by Tony Brook. John Coakley was the Headmaster of Yardley Court and Principal from 1996 to 2017.

Yardley Court has had close links to Tonbridge School for many years. A high proportion of boys have gone on to Tonbridge, many of them winning scholarships. Some Yardley Court choristers are members of the Tonbridge School choir.

The school moved to its current site in 1990. The Yardley Park Road site was sold to a housebuilder for a substantial sum, which secured the school's future. Yardley Court was joined by Derwent Lodge in 1993, with a Pre-Prep school joining in 1996.  The three schools are now known collectively as "Somerhill", often humorously pronounced by pupils as "Zummerhill", with an exaggerated West country accent.

Roll of Honour
44 former students, Masters and catering staff lost their lives in World War I and 63 in World War II. Their names are listed on two plaques on the Roll of Honour. A wreath laying ceremony is held each year on Remembrance Day.

The OYC Roll of Honour includes Wing Commander Eric James Brindley Nicolson VC DFC, Battle of Britain fighter pilot and recipient of the Victoria Cross.

Other notable alumni
 Sam Alper, inventor of the Sprite caravan and Little Chef chain of roadside restaurants.
 Admiral of the Fleet Sir Edward Beckwith Ashmore, British naval officer
 Vice Admiral Sir Peter William Beckwith Ashmore, British naval officer
 John Bee, organist.
 Eric Bickmore, cricketer and Headmaster at the school
 Bernard Cheese, painter and printmaker.
 Patrick Head, mechanic.
 Robert Fisk, journalist.
 Michael Fish, weatherman.
 Gerald Ratner, businessman.
 Andrew Davenport, creator of In the Night Garden and co-creator of Teletubbies.
 Frederick Forsyth, novelist.
 Jon Tickle, presenter.
 Martin Clunes, actor and comedian.
 David Marques, England and British Lions rugby player and member of 1964 America's Cup challenger team aboard the yacht Sovereign.
 Patrick Moore, astronomer. 
 Matthew Parker, author
 David Quayle, businessman and co-founder of B&Q.
 Paul Rutman, producer and writer, including TV series Indian Summers and eight episodes of Vera
 L. J. K. Setright, motoring journalist and author.
 Ed Smith, cricketer and writer.
 Al Pease, racing driver.
 Elleston Trevor, author of Flight of The Phoenix and the Quiller series of espionage novels.
 Jon Snow, journalist and presenter.
 Peter West, presenter.
 Richard Osman, presenter and novelist. 
 Harry Hill, comedian.
 Anthony Worrall Thompson, celebrity chef.
 Bob Woolmer, cricketer.
 Charlie Ross, antiques expert.
 Dick Strawbridge, presenter.
 Charles ffrench-Constant, neurologist. 
 Ruaridh McConnochie, England Rugby and Bath Rugby player.
 Denis Ovens, darts player.

References

Preparatory schools in Kent
1898 establishments in England
Schools in Tonbridge